Mykola Oleksandrovych Shchors (– 30 August 1919) was a Ukrainian communist. He served as Red Army commander, member of the Russian Communist Party, renowned for his personal courage during the Russian Civil War and was sometimes called the Ukrainian Chapayev. In 1918–1919 he fought against the newly established Ukrainian government of the Ukrainian People's Republic. Later he commanded the Bohunsky regiment, brigade, 1st Soviet Ukrainian division and 44th rifle division against the head of the Ukrainian People's Republic Symon Petliura and his Polish allies. Shchors was killed following the evacuation of Kyiv in 1919.

Early life
Mykola Shchors was born in the village of Snovsk of Gorodnya uyezd (Chernigov Governorate) into a family of kulaks. His father, Oleksandr Mykolayovich, was a locomotive engineer, according to the official Soviet historiography. Mykolayovich arrived from a town of Stowbtsy (Minsk Governorate) "in search of better life" where he was able to build a house, which was converted into a memorial museum in August 1939. 

Mykola Shchors was the family's oldest child. His siblings were Konstantin (1896–1979), Akulina (1898–1937), Yekaterina (1900–1984), and Olga (1900–1985). 

In 1905 Mykola enrolled in a parish church school. In 1906 Mykola's mother died giving a birth to another child. About six months after the death of his wife, Mykola's father remarried, this time to Maria Konstantinovna Podbelo. Aleksandr and Maria had five more children: Grigori, Zinaida, Boris, Raisa, and Lidia. In 1909 Mykola Shchors graduated from his church school.

World War I
In 1910 Shchors enrolled in a military medical college (uchilishche) in Kyiv, which was established in 1833. The school was typically attended by the children of retired soldiers. Among its graduates were Ivan Ohienko, Ostap Vyshnya, and Mykhailo Donets. The state scholarship allowed a free enrollment that had to be repaid by army service. 

Shchors graduated from the school in 1914 and, upon receiving the rank of a junior physician assistant, was transferred to the Vilna Military District. In September 1914, when the Russian Empire was drawn into World War I, Shchors went to the front lines as part of the 3rd Light Artillery Division near Vilnius, where he served as a medical assistant and was wounded in battle.

Upon recovery in 1916, Shchors enrolled in the accelerated four-month program at Vilnius Military School that had been evacuated to Poltava in 1915. The school was preparing Under officers and praporshchiks who specialized in tactics, navigation, and trench warfare. Upon graduation in May 1916 Shchors was sent as a praporshchik to a reserve regiment in Simbirsk. In September he transferred to the 335th Anapa Regiment of the 84th Infantry Division (South-Western Front). For his courage and tactical knowledge, Shchors was promoted to a rank of junior lieutenant (podporuchik). However, the trench warfare left a mark on his health when he was diagnosed with tuberculosis and once again sent to the rear.

Revolutionary period
Upon his release on 30 December 1917 from the Simferopol City hospital Shchors was released from military service due to his health. At the beginning of 1918 he returned to Snovsk. Coincidentally, in January 1918 the government of Soviet Russia attacked the Ukrainian People's Republic, accusing the latter of sabotaging the frontlines of the Russian Imperial Army and impeding military maneuvers of the Red Army. In less than three weeks, the Red Guards occupied most of Left-bank Ukraine. Just before elections to the Ukrainian Constituent Assembly, the Red Army under Mikhail Muravyov conquered Kyiv. The government of Ukraine appealed to foreign powers to provide military aid, finding it in the Central Powers that were eager to cooperate to destroy the Russian Revolution.

Sometime after his return to Ukraine, he became acquainted with the chairman of a local Cheka Fruma Rostova (real name Khaikina), whom he married in the fall of 1918. Rostova was in her early 20s and was conducting so-called "cleaning" (zachistka) in the region, an ambiguous Cheka term. Simultaneously around that time, Shchors enrolled in the Russian Communist Party (bolshevik). 

In March–April 1918 he commanded a joint detachment of Novozybkovsky district that fought against the Ukrainian and German armies as a part of the 1st Insurgent Division. In September 1918 he formed the 1st Bohun Regiment and led it against occupying German forces and the externally supported Ukrainian State army. In November 1918 he took command of the 2nd brigade of the 1st Ukrainian Soviet division (Bohun and Tarashcha regiments) and conquered Chernihiv, Kyiv and Fastiv from the Ukrainian Directory. On 5 February 1919 Shchors was appointed mayor of Kyiv.

Between 6 March and 15 August 1919 Shchors again led the 1st Ukrainian Soviet division in its offensive and took control of Zhytomyr, Vinnytsia, and Zhmerynka from Ukrainian People's Republic head Symon Petliura. Then he decisively defended the main forces of Petliura near Sarny - Rivne - Brody - Proskuriv.

In summer 1919 the Polish army began a major offensive. Shchors attempted to hold the line near Sarny - Novohrad-Volynsky - Shepetivka, but was forced to retreat east by the more numerous, better trained, and better equipped Polish army. The 1st Ukrainian Soviet division merged with the 44th Rifle Division and Shchors was appointed its commander. Under his command the division defended the Korostensky railroad junction, allowing the evacuation of Kyiv and the escape of the southern group of the 12th Army from encirclement.

According to an official report, while fighting in the front lines of Bohun regiment, Shchors was killed in obscure circumstances near the Biloshytsi village in Zhytomyr Oblast on 30 August 1919. However, according to Mykhailo Holovatyi, a Ukrainian student of local history, Shchors was killed by a commissar of the 12th Division near Korosten after the decision of the Revolutionary military council. Shchors was buried in Samara, far from the battlefield, for unclear reasons.

Shchors' widow's maiden name was Fruma Khaikina. Her revolutionary name was Rostova, after the heroine of War and Peace, Natasha Rostova. Their daughter married noted Soviet physicist Isaak Khalatnikov.

Legacy

Snovsk, a city in Ukraine was called Shchors between 1935 and 2016. In 1939 Aleksandr Dovzhenko made a film titled Shchors, which was awarded the State Prize of the Soviet Union in 1941. Yevgeny Samoylov played Shchors in the movie. A famous Soviet song, "Song about Shchors", was composed by Matvey Blanter, the author of "Katyusha".

References

External links

An MP3 of the Shchors song
 Website of Unecha city. An article commemorated to Shchors

1895 births
1919 deaths
People from Chernihiv Oblast
People from Chernigov Governorate
Kiev Military Medical School alumni
Soviet komdivs
People of the Polish–Soviet War
Soviet people of the Ukrainian–Soviet War
People of the Russian Civil War
Russian military personnel of World War I
Ukrainian people of World War I